The 1975 World Table Tennis Championships were held in Calcutta, India, The entire tournament was held at the newly constructed Netaji Indoor Stadium, from 6 February – 16 February 1975.

Results

Team

Individual

References

External links
ITTF Museum

 
World Table Tennis Championships
World Table Tennis Championships
World Table Tennis Championships
Table tennis competitions in India
Table